These are the results of the Bahamas national football team.

Key

Key to matches
Att. = Match attendance
(H) = Home ground
(A) = Away ground
(N) = Neutral venue
— = Match attendance not known

Key to record by opponent
P = Games played
W = Games won
D = Games drawn
L = Games lost
GF = Goals for
GA = Goals against

Results

Record by opponent

Sources
RSSF Archive

Results